Morgan Stanley Building is the 24th tallest building in San Diego, California and is a prominent fixture in San Diego's skyline. The 20-story skyscraper has a height of 355 ft (108 m) and is located in the Horton district of Downtown San Diego. It was constructed in 1982 and was designed by architect Langdon Wilson.

History
When a pipe bomb exploded in front of the Edward J. Schwartz Federal Courthouse in May 2008, some of the shrapnel hit the AT&T Building eight stories up.

See also
List of tallest buildings in San Diego

References

External links 

AT&T Building at Emporis.com
AT&T Building at SkyscraperPage.com

AT&T buildings
Skyscraper office buildings in San Diego
1982 establishments in California
Office buildings completed in 1982